Almir Tolja (born 25 October 1974) is a Bosnian retired football goalkeeper who played for the Bosnia and Herzegovina national team. He was the goalkeeping coach of NK Čelik Zenica in the 2011–12 season under Vlatko Glavaš.

International career

He made his debut for Bosnia and Herzegovina in a March 2000 friendly match away against Jordan and has earned a total of 15 caps (1 unofficial), scoring no goals. His final international was an October 2006 European Championship qualification against Greece, coming on as a half time replacement of Kenan Hasagić.

Club career stats
Last update: 25 January 2010

References

External links

1974 births
Living people
People from Travnik
Association football goalkeepers
Bosnia and Herzegovina footballers
Bosnia and Herzegovina international footballers
NK Travnik players
NK Čelik Zenica players
FK Sarajevo players
SW Bregenz players
Saba players
Nassaji Mazandaran players
Premier League of Bosnia and Herzegovina players
Austrian Football Bundesliga players
Persian Gulf Pro League players
Azadegan League players
Bosnia and Herzegovina expatriate footballers
Expatriate footballers in Austria
Bosnia and Herzegovina expatriate sportspeople in Austria
Expatriate footballers in Iran
Bosnia and Herzegovina expatriate sportspeople in Iran